Alfred Nelson may refer to:
Alfred Nelson (cricketer) (1871–1927), English cricketer
Alfred Nelson (footballer) (born 1992), Ghanaian footballer
Alfred C. Nelson (1898–1980), chancellor of the University of Denver

See also
Alfred Nelson-Williams, Sierre Leonan army officer